Thunderbike is a German motorcycle manufacturer, customizer, and official Harley-Davidson dealer.

History 
Thunderbike was founded in 1985, as a Suzuki dealer named Motorradschuppen (eng.: motorcycle shed) in the small town of Hamminkeln in western Germany. Between 1987 and 2001 the Thunderbike Team was successful at the German racing series Deutsche Langstreckenmeisterschaft and produced many customized sports bikes.

In 2003, Thunderbike began to customize Harley-Davidson motorcycles and started to create self-produced frames, custom-wheels and other parts. They reached the 2nd place at the AMD World Championship in 2006 and became one of the most successful European customizers.

Corporate awards 
 European Championship 2006 (1st Place)
 AMD World Championship 2006 (2nd Place)
 Rats Hole Show 2006 Sturgis, South Dakota: 2nd Place
 European Championship 2008 (1st Place)
 Rats Hole Show 2008 Sturgis, South Dakota: (2nd Place)
 European Biker Build Off 2008 @ Custombike Germany (1st Place) 
 Cologne Custom Championship 2010 (1st Place Chopper/Cruiser) 
 AMD World Championship 2012 (1st Place)

Gallery

References

Further reading 
 Klimpke, Katharina; Mangartz, Dirk; and Schneider, Hardy. Old School Motorcycles, Huber Verlag GmbH & Co. KG, Manheim, Germany, 2007.  
 Leyla, Johnny. The Living Legend – Die Geschichte von Harley-Davidson, Komet Verlag GmbH, Cologne, Germany, 2009.  
 Verlag, Huber. Dream Machines – Die 100 spektakulärsten Maschinen, Huber Verlag GmbH & Co. KG, Manheim, Germany, 2008.

External links 
 

Motorcycle manufacturers of Germany
Motorcycle builders